Yamanukku Yaman is a 1980 Indian Tamil-language fantasy comedy film directed by D. Yoganand. Starring Sivaji Ganesan and Sripriya, it is a remake of the 1977 Telugu film Yamagola. The film was released on 16 May 1980, and became a box-office bomb.

Plot 

Sathyam is the village panchayat president having won the election against local rich man Aarumugam. Sathyam is also in love with Savithri, Arumugam's daughter. Sathyam is a reformer and fights for the rights for of the people which pits him against Arumugam who has him killed. In heaven, Sathyam points out the hypocritical behaviour of Indran and is sent to hell. He quickly organises Yama's workers to unionise and fight for their rights. He also convinces Yaman to go to Earth to take a break from his own duties. Convinced, Yaman allows Sathyam to return to Earth where he plans revenge against Aarumugam.

Cast 
Sivaji Ganesan as Yamadharmaraja / Sathyamoorthy
Sripriya as Savithiri
Pandari Bai as Sathyamoorthy's mother
V. K. Ramasamy as Aarumugam
Major Sundarrajan as Indran
Thengai Srinivasan as Chitragupta
V. S. Raghavan
R. S. Manohar as C.I.D. Sivanandam
M. R. R. Vasu as Kanthasamy
Jayamalini as Rambhai
Y. G. Mahendran
Junior Balaiah
Typist Gopu
Pushpalatha as Savithiri's mother

Soundtrack 
The music was composed by K. Chakravarthy.

Release 
Yamanukku Yaman was released on 16 May 1980. P. S. M. of Kalki praised Sivaji's performance in the role of Yaman and added those who are looking for a story feature should keep looking, its just a comedy for a change. The film became a box-office bomb.

References

External links 
 

1980 films
1980s fantasy comedy films
1980s Tamil-language films
Films directed by D. Yoganand
Films scored by K. Chakravarthy
Indian fantasy comedy films
Tamil remakes of Telugu films
Yama in popular culture